Pala Thankam (1941 – 10 January 2021) was an Indian actress in Malayalam movies. She was one of the prominent supporting actresses, singers and dubbing artists in the late 1960s and 1970s in Malayalam and Tamil movies. She acted in more than 100 movies and dubbed for almost 500 films.

Biography
She was born as Thankam at Pala, Kottayam. She was a theater artist before becoming a cine artist. She worked at many drama troupes like KPAC, Vishwakerala kala Samithi, Jyothi Theaters etc. She debuted with the movie Rebecca in 1963 as Sathyan's mother. She made her dubbing debut in 1971 movie, Bobanum Moliyum for the character Boban. She was a sought out dubbing artist during the 1970s who has dubbed for more than 1000 characters and acted in more than 300 movies. She has dubbed for 5 characters in a single movie.

Personal life
Her husband  Sreedharan Thampi, was a police officer, who died in an accident. The couple have three children: Somasekharan Thampi, Bahuleyan Thampi, Ambili. Her daughter Ambili was also a dubbing artist in Malayalam movies. She was deserted by her children and stayed at an aged care facility, Gandhibhavan, Kollam.

Partial filmography

Kinar  (2018)
Muthukudayum Choodi (1989)
Abkari (1988)
Jaithra Yathra (1981)
Jambulingam (1982)
Innalenkil Nale (1982)
Abhinayam (1981)
Chandrahaasam (1980)
Pavizha Muththu (1980) as Kalyani
Prakadanam (1980) as Hostel warden
Lovely (1979)
Kaalam Kathu Ninnilla (1979)
Balapareekshanam (1978)
Aanakkalari (1978)
Ninakku Njaanum Enikku Neeyum (1978)
Beena (1978)
Aniyara (1978)
Anubhoothikalude Nimisham (1978)
Padakuthira (1978)
Ashtamudikkayal (1978)
Chakrayudham (1978)
Randu Penkuttikal (1978)
Anugraham (1977) as School teacher
Jagadguru Aadisankaran (1977)
Aparaajitha (1977)
Yatheem (1977)
Nirakudam (1977)
Anjali (1977)
Ormakal Marikkumo (1977) as Chellamma
Minimol (1977)
Sreedevi (1977)
Aadhya Paadam (1977)
Niraparayum Nilavilakkum (1977)
Ponni (1976)
Abhimaanam (1975)
Mattoru Seetha (1975)
Nathoon (1975)
Rahasyaraathri (1974)
Kanyakumari (1974)
Thumbolarcha (1974) as Paanathi
Chanchala (1974)
Driksakshi (1973) as Paruamma
Kaliyugam (1973) as Keshu's mother
Thekkankattu (1973) as Saramma
Azhakulla Saleena (1973)
Eanippadikal (1973)
Udayam (1973)
Interview (1973) as Susheela's mother
Poymukhangal (1973)
Panimudakku (1972)
Maravil Thirivu Sookshikkuka (1972) as Jayadevan's mother
Akkarapacha (1972)
Theertha Yathra (1972)
Aaradi Manninte Janmi (1972) as Murali's mother
Gandharvakshetram (1972) as Nurse
Nrithasaala (1972)
Taxi Car (1972)
Ganga Sangamam (1971) as Theyyaamma
Aabhijathyam (1971)
Achante Bharya (1971)
Marunaattil Oru Malayaali (1971)
Thurakkatha Vathil (1971)
Anubhavangal Paalichakal (1971)
Kallichellamma (1969)
Rebecca (1963) as Mariya
Kadalamma (1963)
Kedavilakku

Dubbing
Seetha (1960) for Kushalakumari
Siksha	(1971) for Sadhana
Bobanum Moliyum (film) for Master Sekhar
Lisa	(1978) for 	Bhavani
Aarohanam (1980)
Oru Madapravinte Katha (1983)
Krishna Guruvaayoorappa (1984) for Shalini (Baby Shalini)
Itha Innu Muthal (1984)
Eeran Sandhya (1985)
Mounanombaram (1985)
Archana Aradhana (1985)
Puzhayozhukum Vazhi (1985)
Katturumbinu Kathukuthu (1986)
Kaveri (1986)
Akalangalil (1986)
Janmandharam (1988)
Thoranam (1988)
Bheekaran (1988)
Rugmini (1989)
Naale Ennonnundenkil (1990)
Kadalorakkattu (1991)
Chenkol (1993)
Bhoomigeetham (1993)

TV Serial
 Innaleyude Aalkkar {Doordarshan}

Dramas
 Moulikavakasham
 Ningalenne Communistakki
 Surveykkallu
 Mooladhanam

As a Singer
 Kedavilakku

References

External links

Pala Thankam at MSI

Actresses in Malayalam cinema
Indian film actresses
Actresses from Kerala
2021 deaths
People from Pala, Kerala
20th-century Indian actresses
Actresses in Malayalam television
Indian voice actresses
1941 births